Phallostethidae, also known as the priapium fish, is a family of atheriniform fish native to freshwater and brackish habitats in southeast Asia.

They are found in fresh and brackish water from Thailand to the Philippines and Sulawesi. They are named for a muscular organ found under the chin of males. This organ, which may possess small testicles, is used together with the pelvic fins to grasp the female during mating. Unlike most other fish, priapium fishes exhibit internal fertilisation, although they are oviparous.

Subdivision
The family Phallostethidae is divided into two subfamilies and four genera:

 Subfamily Phallostethinae Regan, 1916
 Genus Neostethus Regan, 1916
 Genus Phallostethus Regan, 1916
 Genus Phenacostethus Myers, 1928
 Subfamily Gulaphallinae Aurich, 1937
 Genus Gulaphallus Herre, 1925

References

 
Atheriniformes
Ray-finned fish families